The 2023 American Athletic Conference football season will be the 32nd NCAA Division I FBS Football season of the American Athletic Conference (The American). The season will be the 11th since the former Big East Conference dissolved and became the American Athletic Conference and the ninth season of the College Football Playoff in place. The American is considered a member of the Group of Five (G5) together with Conference USA, the MAC, Mountain West Conference and the Sun Belt Conference. The Conference saw significant realignment prior to the season, with three schools departing the conference and six schools joining. The full schedule for the season was released on February 21, 2023.

Previous season

During the 2022 season, Tulane posted a 10–2 regular season record for the best regular season record in conference. Tulane and UCF advanced to the 2022 American Athletic Conference Football Championship Game, where Tulane won by a score of 45–28. Tulane was invited to the Cotton Bowl Classic, where they defeated USC 46–45.

Conference realignment
The American Athletic Conference underwent significant realignment before the 2023 season. Three schools, Cincinnati, Houston, and UCF, departed the conference to join the Big 12 Conference, having accepted invitations to join two years prior. The American invited six schools to join the conference, all previously from Conference USA: Charlotte, Florida Atlantic, North Texas, Rice, UAB, and UTSA. The realignment brought The American up to 14 football members for the 2023 season.

Head Coaches

Coaching changes
On November 15, 2022, Charlotte announced that Biff Poggi would become to their new head coach beginning in 2023, replacing Will Healy, who had been fired mid-season.
On November 30, 2022, UAB announced that they had hired Trent Dilfer as their permanent head coach, replacing Bryant Vincent, who had been the interim head coach for the entire 2022 season.
On December 1, 2022, Florida Atlantic announced that Tom Herman would take over as head coach, replacing Willie Taggart.
On December 4, 2022, South Florida announced that Alex Golesh would become the new permanent head coach starting in 2023 after the school had fired previous head coach Jeff Scott prior to the end of the 2022 season. Golesh was previously the offensive coordinator at Tennessee.
On December 6, 2022, Tulsa announced that former Ohio State offensive coordinator Kevin Wilson would become to the new coach for the team, replacing Philip Montgomery, who had been fired after the season.
On December 13, 2022, North Texas announced former Washington offensive coordinator Eric Morris as their new head coach, replacing Seth Littrell who had been fired two weeks prior.
On December 19, 2022, Brian Newberry was promoted to head coach of Navy after the school declined to renew Ken Niumatalolo's contract. Newberry was the defensive coordinator for the team prior to promotion.

Coaches

Head coaching records

Note:
Records shown after the 2022 season
Years at school includes 2023 season
Source:

Rankings

Regular season schedule
The 2023 schedule was released on February 21, 2023.

Week 0

Week 1

Week 2

Week 3

Week 4

Week 5

Week 6

Week 7

Week 8

Week 9

Week 10

Week 11

Week 12

Week 13

Championship Game

Week 15

American Athletic Conference records vs other conferences

2023–2024 records against non-conference foes:

American Athletic Conference vs Power 5 matchups
This is a list of games the American has scheduled versus power conference teams (ACC, Big 10, Big 12, Pac-12, Notre Dame and SEC). All rankings are from the current AP Poll at the time of the game.

American Athletic Conference vs Group of Five matchups
The following games include American Athletic Conference teams competing against teams from C-USA, the MAC, Mountain West, or Sun Belt.

American Athletic Conference vs FBS independents matchups
The following games include AAC teams competing against FBS Independents, which includes Army, UConn, or UMass.

American Athletic Conference vs FCS matchups

Awards and honors

Player of the week honors

References

2023 American Athletic Conference football season